Henshaw may refer to:

 Henshaw (surname)
 USS Henshaw (DD-278), a destroyer in the United States Navy

Places
 Henshaw, Northumberland, a village in England
 Henshaw, Kentucky, hometown of Ralph O'Brien
 Lake Henshaw, a lake in California
 Henshaw Cave, part of Cumberland Caverns in Tennessee